Corey Jordan (born 4 March 1999), is an English semi-professional footballer who plays as a defender for National League side Aldershot Town.

Club career
Born in Bournemouth, Dorset, Jordan started his career with local side AFC Bournemouth at the age of seven in the youth team, progressing to the first team to sign his first professional contract in March 2016. In September 2016, he made his professional debut in a 3–2 loss to Preston North End in the EFL Cup, replacing Tyrone Mings as a substitute. In February 2019, Jordan joined Eastbourne Borough on loan in the National League South. In preparation of the 2019–20 season, Jordan went on trial with Southend United before being recalled back by Bournemouth. Then in October 2019, he joined Weymouth in the National League on a short term loan. Following the expiration of his contract, in May 2021 Jordan was released by Bournemouth.

In September 2021, Jordan signed a one-year deal with National League North side Gloucester City. On 19 October 2021 however, Jordan joined National League club Aldershot Town, just one month into his one year deal.

Career statistics

References

External links

1999 births
Living people
Association football defenders
English footballers
AFC Bournemouth players
Eastbourne Borough F.C. players
Weymouth F.C. players
Gloucester City A.F.C. players
Aldershot Town F.C. players
National League (English football) players
Footballers from Bournemouth